George Washington Elementary School may refer to:

George Washington Elementary School, School City of East Chicago school district, Illinois
George Washington Elementary School, Mohegan Lake, New York; see Lakeland Central School District
George Washington Elementary School, Pigtown, Baltimore, Maryland
George Washington Elementary School, Burbank, California; see Burbank Unified School District
George Washington Elementary School, Daly City, California;  Jefferson Elementary School District
George Washington School (now housing Vare-Washington School), Philadelphia, Pennsylvania
George Washington Elementary School, Union City, New Jersey; see Union City Board of Education

See also
 George Washington School (disambiguation)
 Washington Elementary School (disambiguation)